Yin Li, also known as Yin Lu'er and Yin Lu, was a military officer who served under the warlords Zang Ba, Lü Bu and Cao Cao in the late Eastern Han dynasty of China. Later, he served as a military officer in the state of Cao Wei during the Three Kingdoms period.

Life
Sometime in the 190s, Yin Li, along with Zang Ba, Sun Guan (孫觀), Wu Dun (吳敦), Chang Xi (昌狶) and others, formed a small army, with Zang Ba as their chief, and garrisoned at Kaiyang County (開陽縣; present-day Linyi, Shandong).

In 198, when the warlords Cao Cao and Lü Bu were at war, Zang Ba and his followers led their troops to help Lü Bu. After Lü Bu's defeat and death at the Battle of Xiapi later that year, Zang Ba and his followers willingly surrendered to Cao Cao and became his subordinates. Cao Cao appointed them to various positions and put Zang Ba in charge of parts of Qing and Xu provinces. Yin Li served as the Administrator of Dongguan Commandery (東莞郡; around present-day Yishui County, Shandong).

Yin Li served as a military officer in the state of Wei under Cao Cao's son and successor, Cao Pi, after Cao Pi usurped the throne in late 220 and established Wei to replace the Eastern Han dynasty. Between October 222 and January 223, Yin Li fought in the Battle of Dongkou against Wei's rival state, Eastern Wu. He was killed in action against the Wu general Quan Cong.

See also
 Lists of people of the Three Kingdoms

Notes

References

 Chen, Shou (3rd century). Records of the Three Kingdoms (Sanguozhi).
 Pei, Songzhi (5th century). Annotations to Records of the Three Kingdoms (Sanguozhi zhu).
 

Year of birth unknown
3rd-century deaths
Lü Bu and associates
Generals under Cao Cao
Cao Wei generals
Political office-holders in Shandong
Three Kingdoms people killed in battle